General Kamal Hassan Ali (18 September 1921 – 27 March 1993) was an Egyptian politician and military hero.

Biography

Aly was born in Cairo on 18 September 1921. He attended medical school, but did not finish it and joined military academy. He was commissioned as a combat engineering officer in 1942, and served as a sapper and pioneer commander with the British Army during World War II.

He was involved in the 1948 Arab–Israeli War and as Engineer-in-Chief the Yom Kippur War. Between 1973 and 1975, he was commander of the Central Military Zone. He was head of the Egyptian Intelligence Service from 1975 to 1978. After that, he served as minister of defense and military production under president Anwar Sadat. Aly also played a role in peace negotiations between Egypt and Israel, resulting in a treaty in 1979. From 1980 to 1984, he was the deputy prime minister and foreign secretary.

He was the Prime Minister of Egypt from 17 July 1984 to 4 September 1985. Then he became the chairman of the Egyptian-Gulf Bank in 1986. He was head of the Egyptian General Intelligence Directorate from 1986 to 1989.

Kamal Hassan Aly was married to Amal Khairy and had three children. He died in Cairo on 27 March 1993 at the age of 71 and was buried with a military funeral.

References

1921 births
1993 deaths
20th-century prime ministers of Egypt
Defence Ministers of Egypt
Foreign ministers of Egypt
Politicians from Cairo
National Democratic Party (Egypt) politicians
Directors of the General Intelligence Directorate (Egypt)
British Army personnel of World War II